Georgia's 14th congressional district was created following the 2010 Census, when Georgia gained a 14th seat in the U.S. House of Representatives. The district is represented by Republican Marjorie Taylor Greene.

The district is mostly rural and exurban in character. Like most of north Georgia, it has turned almost solidly Republican. While conservative Democrats held most local offices and state legislative seats in what is now the 14th well into the 1990s, today there are almost no elected Democrats above the county level. Since the district was created, only one Democrat has managed as much as 30 percent of the vote.

Geography 
The district is in northwest Georgia and includes the cities of Rome, Calhoun and Dalton.  The congressional district includes the following counties in northwest Georgia: After the 2020 census, the congressional map was altered to remove Haralson County and Pickens County and add the western portion of Cobb County.
 Catoosa County
 Chattooga County
 Cobb County (partial, see also 11th district and 6th district)
 Dade County
 Floyd County
 Gordon County
 Murray County
 Paulding County
 Polk County
 Walker County
 Whitfield County

The three northernmost counties in the district are part of the Chattanooga, Tennessee metropolitan area and television market, with the central and southern portions reckoned as exurbs of Atlanta.

List of members representing the district 
District established from portions of the old 9th and 11th districts following the 112th Congress, based on the 2010 census.

Recent results in statewide elections

Election results

2012

2014

2016

2018

2020

2022

See also

Georgia's congressional districts
List of United States congressional districts

References

External links
 Georgia's 14th congressional district at GovTrack.us

14
Constituencies established in 2013
2013 establishments in Georgia (U.S. state)